Zoss is a surname. Notable people with the surname include:

A. O. Zoss, American engineer
Roland Zoss (born 1951), Swiss songwriter and novelist
Joel Zoss (born 1944), American singer, guitarist, songwriter, and author

See also
Moss (surname)
Ross (name)